José Guadalupe Rivera Rivera (born 12 December 1951) is a Mexican politician from the National Action Party. From 2006 to 2009 he served as Deputy of the LX Legislature of the Mexican Congress representing San Luis Potosí, and was previously a local deputy in the LVIII Legislature of the Congress of San Luis Potosí.

References

1951 births
Living people
Politicians from San Luis Potosí
National Action Party (Mexico) politicians
21st-century Mexican politicians
Deputies of the LX Legislature of Mexico
Members of the Chamber of Deputies (Mexico) for San Luis Potosí
Members of the Congress of San Luis Potosí